A barracuda is a predatory fish found in tropical and subtropical oceans.

Barracuda or Baracuda may also refer to:

Computing
 Barracuda (web framework), an MVC web framework for Java
 Seagate Barracuda, a line of computer hard drives
 Barracuda Networks, a company specializing in e-mail spam firewalls, web filters, email archivers, and backup solutions
 Opera Barracuda, the codename for version 11.10 of the Opera web browser

Film and television
 Barracuda (1978 film), an American horror film
 Barracuda (1988 film), an Australian TV film
 Act of Piracy or Barracuda, a 1990 film 
 Barracuda (1997 film), a French film by Philippe Haïm
 Barracuda (2017 film), an American film starring Allison Tolman
 Barracuda (TV series), a 2016 Australian TV miniseries

Literature
 Barracuda (comics), a villain from Marvel Comics' The Punisher series
 Barracuda & Frollo, characters from Lion Comics
 Barracuda, a 2013 novel by Christos Tsiolkas

Music
 Baracuda (band), a German dance music project
 The Barracudas, a British band from the late 1970s to early 1980s
 Baracuda (rapper) (born 1983), Canadian hip hop artist
 Moby or Barracuda, techno recording artist

Albums
 Barracuda (Quantum Jump album)
 Barracuda (Kinky album)

Songs
 "Barracuda" (song), a 1977 song by Heart
 "Barracuda", a song by John Cale from Fear
 "Barracuda", a song by Jack Costanzo
 "Barracuda", a song by Noisestorm
 "Barracuda", a song by Afric Simone

Vehicles
 Plymouth Barracuda, an automobile

Aircraft
 EADS Barracuda, an unmanned aerial vehicle
 Fairey Barracuda, a carrier-borne torpedo bomber airplane
 Jeffair Barracuda, an all-wood experimental homebuilt aircraft design
 Lancair Barracuda, an American kit aircraft

Ships and submarines
 French Barracuda class submarine
 USS Barracuda (SP-845), a patrol boat in commission from 1917 to 1919
 USS Barracuda (SS-163), a submarine in commission from 1924 to 1937 and from 1940 to 1945
 USS Barracuda (SSK-1), a submarine in commission from 1951 to 1959
 United States Barracuda-class submarine (1951)
 United States Barracuda-class submarine (1919) or V-boats V-1 through V-3
 NRP Barracuda, an Albacora class submarine developed for the Portuguese Navy
 Project 945 "Barrakuda", Soviet designation for Sierra-class submarines

Other uses 
 Barracuda (cocktail), a rum cocktail
 Barracuda Lounge, a New York City gay bar
 Eli Barracuda, a Henchmen in Evil Genius (video game) and Evil Genius 2: World Domination games.
 FN Barracuda, a revolver
 Saab Barracuda, a military camouflage system developed by the Swedish defense company Saab AB
 San Jose Barracuda, an American Hockey League team
 Acestrorhynchus or freshwater barracuda, a South American freshwater fish

See also
 USS Barracuda, a list of United States Navy ships and submarines